Noël Tosi (born 25 May 1959) is a French football coach and former player. He is currently the manager of Africa Sports. As a player, he played for minor clubs in France. His first job as a coach was Deauville in 1986. Tosi previously coached the Congo national team. He was sworn in as coach in September 2006 after coaching the Mauritania national team, and French Ligue 2 teams FC Gueugnon and US Créteil-Lusitanos previously. Tosi was charged with improving Congo, and perhaps getting them to the African Cup of Nations.

Managerial career
In 2014 Tosi quit as manager of US Le Pontet. At the time, the club was in fourth place in the CFA. Tosi was manager of MDA Chasselay for one-and-a-half seasons. He escaped relegation from the CFA in the 2014–15 season. In June 2016 it was announced he had agreed the termination of his contract with the club. The club's president cited financial constraints preventing the club from keeping Tosi. After being unable to prevent FC Mulhouse's relegation to Championnat National 3 in the previous season, Tosi left the club in June 2017.

References

External links
 The ejector seat in Africa - FIFA.com, 16 September 2003
 Africa in my blood FIFA.com, 6 September 2006

1959 births
Living people
French people of Italian descent
Sportspeople from Skikda
Pieds-Noirs
French footballers
Association football goalkeepers
AC Avignonnais players
Gazélec Ajaccio players
Ligue 2 players
French football managers
Grenoble Foot 38 managers
AC Avigonnnais managers
Dijon FCO managers
FC Gueugnon managers
US Créteil-Lusitanos managers
Mauritania national football team managers
Racing Club de France Football managers
Angers SCO managers
Congo national football team managers
AS Cherbourg Football managers
Nîmes Olympique managers
FC Mulhouse managers
Ligue 1 managers
Ligue 2 managers
French expatriate football managers
French expatriate sportspeople in the Republic of the Congo
French expatriate sportspeople in Morocco
French expatriate sportspeople in Luxembourg
Expatriate football managers in Mauritania
Expatriate football managers in the Republic of the Congo
Expatriate football managers in Luxembourg
Expatriate football managers in Ivory Coast
French expatriate sportspeople in Mauritania